Sipho Mangindi Burns-Ncamashe Aa! Zilimbola! (1920–1996) was a South African poet, short story writer and Xhosa imbongi (praise poet). He was also the chief of the AmaGwali Xhosa sub-group in Alice.
He was also the leader of the Ciskei National Unionist Party from 1972–1978, the only member from his party to get a seat in the Republic of Ciskei National Assembly, until 1978 when he joined the Ciskei opposition party, the Ciskei National Party led by Chief Justice Mabandla. In 1979, Ciskei officially became a one-party state under the rule of Lennox Sebe and Burns-Ncamashe remained as one of the members of the Ciskei National Assembly.

Sipho Burns-Ncamashe was the praise singer for Rharhabe Paramaount Chief, Velile Sandile, grandfather to the Rharhabe Xhosa king King Maxhob'ayakhawuleza Sandile Aa! Zanesizwe!. Burns-Ncamashe's son Chief Sisanda Sipuxolo Burns-Ncamashe succeeded him after his death. His youngest son Zolile Burns-Ncamashe is a spokesperson to the AmaRharhabe royal family.

List of works by author
Masibaliselane (1961) – a collection of short stories and poems
Izibongo zakwaSesile (1979) – collection of poems

References
Galloway, Francis (1983). SA Literature University of Virginia

External links
Some aspects of imagery in the poetry of S.M. Burns-Ncamashe.(Critical Essay)

People from the Eastern Cape
Xhosa people
Xhosa-language poets
South African poets
1920 births
1996 deaths
South African male short story writers
South African short story writers
20th-century poets
20th-century short story writers
20th-century South African male writers